Stanley Hillier (born 1904) was an English professional football player and manager.

Career
Hillier was born in London in 1904. He played football for Erith & Belvedere, before joining Bradford City in May 1924. He made 11 first-team appearances with Bradford scoring two goals, all in the Football League, before joining Gillingham in December 1926. He played for Gillingham until 1928, making 26 appearances and scoring four goals.

Hillier later played in France for AS Cannes and FC Sète, and also managed Cannes between 1932 and 1934.

References

1904 births
Year of death missing
Footballers from Greater London
English footballers
Association football inside forwards
Erith & Belvedere F.C. players
Bradford City A.F.C. players
Gillingham F.C. players
AS Cannes players
FC Sète 34 players
English Football League players
Ligue 1 players
Expatriate footballers in France
English football managers
AS Cannes managers
English expatriates in France
English expatriate footballers
English expatriate football managers
Expatriate football managers in France
Date of death missing